Dalley is a surname. Notable people with the surname include:

Amy Dalley (born 1981), American country singer-songwriter
Denver Dalley, American singer-songwriter
Derrick Dalley (born 1965), Canadian politician
Gifford Dalley, American politician
Helen Dalley (born 1957), Australian journalist
Horace Dalley, (born 1950) Jamaican politician
John Dalley (born 1935), American classical violinist
John Bede Dalley (1876–1935), Australian journalist and writer
Richard Dalley, American ice dancer
William Bede Dalley (1831–1888), Australian politician and barrister

See also
Division of Dalley, former electoral division in New South Wales, Australia